Montserrado-16 is an electoral district for the elections to the House of Representatives of Liberia. The district covers the borough of New Kru Town.

Elected representatives

References

Electoral districts in Liberia